Breakbeat is a broad type of electronic music that tends to use drum breaks sampled from early recordings of funk, jazz, and R&B. Breakbeats have been used in styles such as hip hop, jungle, drum and bass, big beat, breakbeat hardcore, and UK garage styles (including 2-step, breakstep and dubstep).

Etymology

The origin of the word "breakbeat" is the fact that the drum loops that were sampled occurred during a "break" in the music - for example the Amen break (a drum solo from "Amen, Brother" by The Winstons) or the Think Break (from "Think (About It)" by Lyn Collins).

History

1970s—1980s: Classic breaks and hip hop production
Beginning in 1973 and continuing through the late 1970s and early 1980s, hip hop turntablists, such as DJ Kool Herc began using several funk breaks in a row, using drum breaks from jazz-funk tracks such as James Brown's "Funky Drummer" and The Winstons' "Amen Brother", to form the rhythmic base for hip hop songs. DJ Kool Herc's breaks style involved playing the same record on two turntables and playing the break repeatedly, alternating between the two records. Grandmaster Flash perfected this idea with what he called the "quick-mix theory": he would mark the points on the record where the break began and ended with a crayon, so that he could easily replay the break by spinning the record and not touching the tone arm. This style was copied and improved upon by early hip hop DJs Afrika Bambaataa and Grand Wizard Theodore. This style was extremely popular in clubs and dancehalls because the extended breaks compositions provided breakers with more opportunities to showcase their skills.

In the late 1970s, hip hop was all about the break. In the 1980s, the evolution of technology began to make sampling breaks easier and more affordable for DJs and producers, which helped nurture the commercialization of hip hop. Through crude techniques such as pausing tapes and then recording the break, by the 1980s, technology allowed anybody with a tape recorder to find the breakbeat.

1990s: Evolution as electronic dance genre 
In the late-1980s, breakbeat became an essential feature of many genres of breaks music which became popular within the global dance music scene, including acid breaks, electro-funk, and Miami bass, and decade later big beat and nu skool breaks. 

In the early 1990s, acid house artists and producers started using breakbeat samples in their music to create breakbeat hardcore. The hardcore scene then diverged into subgenres like jungle and drum and bass, which generally was faster and focused more on complex sampled drum patterns. An example of this is Goldie's album Timeless. Josh Lawford of Ravescene prophesied that breakbeat was "the death-knell of rave" because the ever-changing drumbeat patterns of breakbeat music didn't allow for the same zoned out, trance-like state that the standard, steady 4/4 beats of house enabled. 

Incorporating many components of those genres, the Florida breaks subgenre followed during the early-to-mid 1990s and had a unique sound that was soon internationally popular among producers, DJs, and club-goers.

In 1994, the influential techno act Autechre released the Anti EP in response to the Criminal Justice and Public Order Act 1994, deliberately using advanced algorithmic programming to generate non-repetitive breakbeats for the full duration of the tracks, in order to subvert the legal definitions within that legislation which specified in the section creating police powers to remove ravers from raves that "'music' includes sounds wholly or predominantly characterised by the emission of a succession of repetitive beats".

In the late 1990s, another style of breakbeat emerged, funky breaks, a style that was incorporating elements of trance, hip hop and jungle. It was pioneered by the Chemical Brothers and James Lavelle's Mo'Wax Records imprint. The genre had commercial peak in 1997, when such music was topping in pop charts and often featured in commercials. The most notable artists of the sound were The Prodigy, Death in Vegas, The Crystal Method, Propellerheads.

Characteristics
The tempo of breaks tracks, ranging from 110 to 150 beats per minute, allows DJs to mix breaks with a wide range of different genres in their sets. This has led to breakbeats being used in many hip hop, jungle/drum & bass and hardcore tracks. They can also be heard in other music, anywhere from popular music to background music in car and clothing commercials on radio or TV.

The "Amen break" 

The Amen break, a drum break from The Winstons' song "Amen, Brother" is widely regarded as one of the most widely used and sampled breaks among music using breakbeats.  This break was first used on "King of the Beats" by Mantronix, and has since been used in thousands of songs. Other popular breaks are from James Brown's Funky Drummer (1970) and Give it Up or Turnit a Loose, The Incredible Bongo Band's 1973 cover of The Shadows' "Apache", and Lyn Collins' 1972 song "Think (About It)". The Winstons have not received royalties for third-party use of samples of the break recorded on their original music release.

Sampled breakbeats
With the advent of digital sampling and music editing on the computer, breakbeats have become much easier to create and use. Now, instead of cutting and splicing tape sections or constantly backspinning two records at the same time, a computer program can be used to cut, paste, and loop breakbeats endlessly. Digital effects such as filters, reverb, reversing, time stretching and pitch shifting can be added to the beat, and even to individual sounds by themselves. Individual instruments from within a breakbeat can be sampled and combined with others, thereby creating wholly new breakbeat patterns.

Legal issues
With the rise in popularity of breakbeat music and the advent of digital audio samplers, companies started selling "breakbeat packages" for the express purpose of helping artists create breakbeats. A breakbeat kit CD would contain many breakbeat samples from different songs and artists, often without the artist's permission or even knowledge.

Subgenres

Acid breaks
In electronic music, "acid breaks" is a fusion between breakbeat, acid house and other forms of dance music. Its drum line usually mimics most breakbeat music, lacking the distinctive kick drum of other forms of dance music. One of the earliest synthesizers to be employed in acid music was the Roland TB-303, which makes use of a resonant low-pass filter to emphasize the harmonics of the sound.

Big beat

Big beat is a term employed since the mid-1990s by the British music press to describe much of the music by artists such as The Prodigy, Cut La Roc, Fatboy Slim, The Chemical Brothers, The Crystal Method and Propellerheads typically driven by heavy breakbeats and synthesizer-generated loops and patterns in common with established forms of electronic dance music such as techno and acid house.

Progressive breaks
Progressive breaks or prog breaks, also known as atmospheric breaks, is a subgenre of breaks that is essentially a fusion of breakbeat and progressive house. Much like progressive house, this subgenre is characterized by its "trancey" sound. Its defining traits include extended synthesizer pads and washes, melodic synth leads, heavy reverberation, and electronic breakbeats. However, unlike progressive house, very few progressive breaks tracks have vocals, with most tracks being entirely instrumental or using only electronically altered snippets of vocal samples for sonic effect. Typical progressive breaks tracks will often have a long build-up section that leads to a breakdown and a climax, often having numerous sonic elements being added or subtracted from the track at various intervals in order to increase its intensity. Progressive breaks artists include Hybrid, BT, Way Out West, Digital Witchcraft, Momu, Wrecked Angle, Burufunk, Under This and Fretwell.

See also

Nu skool breaks
Big beat
Breakdance
Breakstep
Electro
Florida breaks
List of electronic music genres
Syncopation

References

External links
 Electronic Music 101: What Are Breakbeats?
 Breakbeat from Ishkur's Guide to Electronic Music
 Dizzines Records Breakbeat

 
British styles of music
Electronic dance music genres